Claude Basire (1764 – 5 April 1794) was a French politician of the Revolutionary period.

Biography
Born in Dijon, he became a deputy for the Côte-d'Or in the Legislative Assembly, he made himself prominent by denouncing the Bourbon and the Tuileries Palace's comité autrichien (“Austrian committee”, the purported Royalist group supporting the Austrians with whom the country was at war). On 20 June 1792, he spoke in favor of the deposition of King Louis XVI, though on 20 September he advised discussion before moving to decide in favour of abolition.

Elected to the National Convention, he affiliated with The Mountain, opposing the adjournment of the king's trial, and voting in favor of his execution. He joined the attack upon the Girondists, but, as member of the Committee of General Security, he condemned the Reign of Terror.

He was implicated by François Chabot in the falsification of a decree relative to the East India Company. Although his involvement seems only to have been that he failed to reveal the plot – of which he knew only part – he was nonetheless accused before the Revolutionary Tribunal at the same time as Georges Danton and Camille Desmoulins. He was guillotined.

He is honoured in the streetname Rue Claude Basire in central Dijon.

References

Attrition
 

1764 births
1794 deaths
Politicians from Dijon
Deputies to the French National Convention
Members of the Legislative Assembly (France)
Regicides of Louis XVI
French people executed by guillotine during the French Revolution